The Mutasarrifate of Jerusalem, also known as the Sanjak of Jerusalem, was an Ottoman district with special administrative status established in 1872. The district encompassed Jerusalem as well as Hebron, Jaffa, Gaza and Beersheba. During the late Ottoman period, the Mutasarrifate of Jerusalem, together with the Sanjak of Nablus and Sanjak of Akka (Acre), formed the region that was commonly referred to as "Palestine". It was the 7th most heavily populated region of the Ottoman Empire's 36 provinces.

The district was separated from Damascus Eyalet and placed directly under the Ottoman central government in Constantinople (now Istanbul) in 1841, and formally created as an independent province in 1872 by Grand Vizier Mahmud Nedim Pasha. Scholars provide a variety of reasons for the separation, including increased European interest in the region, and strengthening of the southern border of the Empire against the Khedivate of Egypt. Initially, the Mutasarrifate of Acre and Mutasarrifate of Nablus were combined with the province of Jerusalem, with the combined province being referred to in the register of the court of Jerusalem as the "Jerusalem Eyalet", and referred to by the British consul as creation of "Palestine into a separate eyalet". However, after less than two months, the sanjaks of Nablus and Acre were separated and added to the Vilayet of Beirut, leaving just the Mutasarrifate of Jerusalem. In 1906, the Kaza of Nazareth was added to the Jerusalem Mutasarrifate, as an exclave, primarily in order to allow the issuance of a single tourist permit to Christian travellers. The area was conquered by the Allied Forces in 1917 during World War I and a military Occupied Enemy Territory Administration (OETA South) set up to replace the Ottoman administration. OETA South consisted of the Ottoman sanjaks of Jerusalem, Nablus and Acre. The military administration was replaced by a British civilian administration in 1920 and the area of OETA South was incorporated into the British Mandate of Palestine in 1923.

The political status of the Mutasarrifate of Jerusalem was unique from other Ottoman provinces as it was under the direct authority of the Ottoman capital Constantinople. The inhabitants identified themselves primarily on religious terms, 84% being Muslim Arabs. The district's villages were normally inhabited by farmers while its towns were populated by merchants, artisans, landowners and money-lenders. The elite consisted of the religious leadership, wealthy landlords and high-ranking civil servants.

History

In 1841, the district was separated from Damascus Eyalet and placed directly under Constantinople and formally created as an independent Mutasarrifate in 1872. Before 1872, the Mutasarrifate of Jerusalem was officially a sanjak within the Syria Vilayet (created in 1864, following the Tanzimat reforms).

The southern border of the Mutasarifate of Jerusalem was redrawn in 1906, at the instigation of the British, who were interested in safeguarding their imperial interests and in making the border as short and patrollable as possible.

In the mid-19th century the inhabitants of Palestine identified themselves primarily in terms of religious affiliation. The population was 84% Muslim Arabs, 10% Christian Arabs, 5% Jewish, and 1% Druze Arabs. Towards the end of the 19th century, the idea that the region of Palestine or the Mutasarifate of Jerusalem formed a separate political entity became widespread among the district's educated Arab classes. In 1904, former Jerusalem official Najib Azuri formed in Paris, France the Ligue de la Patrie Arabe ("Arab Fatherland League") whose goal was to free Ottoman Syria and Iraq from Turkish domination. In 1908, Azuri proposed the elevation of the mutassarifate to the status of vilayet to the Ottoman Parliament after the 1908 Young Turk Revolution.

The area was conquered by the Allied Forces in 1917 during the Palestine campaign of World War I and a military Occupied Enemy Territory Administration (OETA South) set up to replace the Ottoman administration. OETA South consisted of the Ottoman sanjaks of Jerusalem, Nablus and Acre. The military administration was replaced by a British civilian administration in 1920 and the area of OETA South became the territory of the British Mandate of Palestine in 1923, with some border adjustments with Lebanon and Syria.

Boundaries
The division was bounded on the west by the Mediterranean, on the east by the River Jordan and the Dead Sea, on the north by a line from the mouth of the river Auja to the bridge over the Jordan near Jericho, and on the south by a line from midway between Gaza and Arish to Aqaba.

Maps
Below are a series of contemporary Ottoman maps showing the "Quds Al-Sharif Sancağı" or "Quds Al-Sharif Mutasarrıflığı". The 1907 maps show the 1860 borders between Ottoman Syria and the Khedivate of Egypt, although the border was moved to the current Israel-Egypt border in 1906, and the area north of the Negev Desert is labelled "Filastin" (Palestine).

Administrative divisions
Administrative divisions of the Mutasarrifate (1872-1909):

 Beersheba Kaza, which included two sub-districts and a municipality: 
a-Hafir, created in 1908 as a middle point between Beersheba and Aqaba, close to the newly agreed border with Sinai
al-Mulayha, created in 1908 as a midway point between Hafir and Aqaba
Beersheba, created in 1901
 Gaza Kaza, which included three sub-districts and a municipality: 
Al-Faluja, created in 1903
Khan Yunis, created in 1903 and became a municipality in 1917
al-Majdal, created in 1880
Gaza, created in 1893
Hebron Kaza, which included two sub-districts and a municipality: 
Bayt 'Itab, created in 1903
Bayt Jibrin, created in 1903
Hebron, created in 1886
 Jaffa Kaza, which included two sub-districts and a municipality: 
Ni'lin, created in 1903
Ramla, created in 1880, became municipality before 1888 and re-established as sub-district in 1889
Lydda
 Jerusalem Kaza, which included four sub-districts and two municipalities: 
Abwein, created in 1903; 
Bethlehem, created in 1883 and became a municipality in 1894; 
Ramallah, created in 1903 and became a municipality in 1911, 
Saffa, 
Jerusalem, created in 1867 and 
Beit Jala, created in 1912.
Nazareth Kaza, established 1906.

Mutasarrıfs of Jerusalem
The Mutasarrıfs of Jerusalem were appointed by the Sublime Porte to govern the district. They were usually experienced civil servants who spoke little or no Arabic, but knew a European language - most commonly French - in addition to Ottoman Turkish.

Pre-separation from Damascus
 Sureyya Pasha 1857–63
 Izzet Pasha 1864–67
 Nazif Pasha 1867–69
 Kamil Pasha 1869–71
 Ali Bey 1871–72

Post-separation from Damascus
 Nazif Pasha (same as above) 1872–73
 Kamil Pasha (same as above) 1873–75
 Ali Bey (same as above) 1874–76
 Faik Bey 1876–77
 Mehmed Rauf Pasha 1877–89
 Resad Pasha 1889–90
 Ibrahim Hakki Pasha 1890–97
 Mehmet Tevfik Biren 1897–01
 Mehmet Cavit Bey 1901–02
 Osman Kazim Bey 1902–04
 Ahmed Resid Bey 1904–06
 Ali Ekrem Bolayır 1906–08

Post-Young Turk Revolution
List of mutasarrıfs after the 1908 Young Turk Revolution:
 Subhi Bey 1908–09
 Nazim Bey 1909–10
 Azmi Bey 1910–11
 Cevdet Bey 1911–12
 Mehdi Frashëri (Muhdi Bey) 1912
 Tahir Hayreddin Bey 1912–13
 Ahmed Macid Bey 1913–15

See also
 Ottoman Syria
 History of Jerusalem
 Mount Lebanon Mutasarrifate
 Timeline of the name "Palestine"

Notes

References

Bibliography

 
 
 
 
 
 
 
 
 
 
 
 
  
 

Late modern history of Jerusalem
1872 establishments in Ottoman Syria
1917 disestablishments in the Ottoman Empire
Land of Israel
History of Jordan
Ottoman Palestine
Jerusalem